Unseen is the seventh studio album by Swedish metal band the Haunted, released on 16 March 2011. The album begins to experiment with a more rock-influenced alternative metal sound mixed with their usual groove metal and melodic death metal sound.

While in the process of creating the album, vocalist Peter Dolving, in an interview, predicted, "It's going to be epic. Danceable. Groovy. And very very arty farty metal. With this next record we are going to be taking a piss in the general direction of all the crappy 99.9 percent of generic contemporary Mr. Goatse jerks out there".

The album cover and track list were revealed on 28 January 2011. The cover was done by Frode Sylthe, a friend of the band, who also did the cover to their 2004 album Revolver. The band has said that they "really like his design aesthetic, and he seems to come up with something unique every single time".

Background 
The writing process for the album began in August 2009, a year after the release of Versus, and forty songs were written for the album prior to 21 April 2010 according to vocalist Peter Dolving. The album title was revealed by Dolving on 30 December 2010, at which time the album was finished except for some minor details. It was revealed that the title track "Unseen" was co-written by David Johansson of ColdTears.

Track listing 
All music by Björler / Björler / Dolving (track 6 "Unseen" was co-written with David Johansson). All lyrics by Peter Dolving.

Notes 
1.  "No Ghost" was the first sneak preview song off the album on 22 January 2011, when the band performed the song at the P3 Guld Gala, broadcast live on TV and radio throughout Sweden.

2.  "Disappear" is the second song (originally third, see below) that premiered on 21 February 2011's edition of BBC Radio 1's "Rock Show With Daniel P Carter"

3.  "Unseen" was planned to premiere on 11 February 2011 at 7:30 p.m. CET, broadcast on Bandit Rock, but never aired for unknown reasons. It was later available for streaming on the band's Facebook page on 24 February.

Personnel 
The Haunted
Patrik Jensen – rhythm guitar
Jonas Björler – bass
Anders Björler – lead guitar
Peter Dolving – vocals
Per Möller Jensen – drums

Guests
 David Johansson – songwriter on "Unseen"
Tue Madsen – mixing and production

References

External links 
 NoCleanSinging Review

2011 albums
The Haunted (Swedish band) albums
Century Media Records albums
Albums produced by Tue Madsen